Line M5, officially referred to as the M5 Üsküdar–Çekmeköy line, is a rapid transit line of the Istanbul Metro System. It is the second rapid transit line on the Asian side of İstanbul, the other in service since August 2012, the M4. Furthermore, it is the first driverless rapid transit line in Turkey.

Overview
The construction of the  line in the west–east direction with 16 stations between Üsküdar and Çekmeköy, and its connection line to the depot with  length began on 20 March 2012. Projected to cost about 564 million, the line is built by the Doğuş Construction Group and was expected to open in May 2015; however, the expected opening day was then revised to 20 September 2016, until it became clear that it would not open then. According to news in Turkish TV in November 2016, half of the M5 line (Üsküdar - Ümraniye) would open in January 2017, with driverless trains, and then in early 2017 the new opening date was stated to be 22 March providing there are no further delays. But in April 2017 the opening date had been postponed further to 30 August 2017. Later it was postponed further, first to 14 September 2017 and then to 29 October 2017. Finally the line was opened on 15 December 2017.

Earlier plans  to extend M5 to Sabiha Gökçen International Airport in the future have been cancelled, with the M4 instead being planned to extend to this airport.

Stations 
The M5 has a total of 16 stations. Together with these 16 stations, 8 more are planned within the M5's eastward extension to Sultanbeyli. All stations have protective barriers with automatic doors, opening only when the train is stopped at the platform.

See also 
 Public transport in Istanbul
 Istanbul Metro
 Istanbul modern tramways
 Istanbul nostalgic tramways
 Marmaray

References

Istanbul Metro
Transport infrastructure under construction in Turkey
Üsküdar
Ümraniye
Çekmeköy
Sancaktepe
Railway lines opened in 2017
2017 establishments in Turkey